Sture Christensson is a Swedish former sailor in the Star class. He won the 1970 Star European Championships crewing for Stig Wennerström.

References

Swedish male sailors (sport)
Star class sailors
Possibly living people
Year of birth missing